Shravasti is a town in Shravasti district in Indian State of Uttar Pradesh. It was the capital of the ancient Indian kingdom of Kosala and the place where the Buddha lived most after his enlightenment. It is near the Rapti river in the northeastern part of Uttar Pradesh India, close to the Nepalese border.

Sravasti is one of the most revered sites in Buddhism. It is believed to be where the Buddha taught many of his Suttas (sermons), converted many of his famous disciples, and performed his "Sravasti miracles" – "great miracle" and "twin miracle" – a subject of numerous historic reliefs, statues and literature in Buddhism. Sravasti is also important to Hinduism and Jainism. The earliest manuscripts of both mention it and weave some of their legends in Sravasti. Archaeological excavations of the Sravasti site have unearthed numerous artworks and monuments related to Buddhism, Hinduism and Jainism.

Sravasti, as a capital, was at the junction of three major trading routes in ancient India, connecting it to the different regions of the Indian subcontinent. Inscribed slabs and statues found at and near Sravasti suggest it was an active Buddhist site and prosperous area from the time of the Buddha ( 5th-century BCE) through at least the 12th-century CE. It was destroyed and covered with mounds sometime in or after the 13th-century, chronologically marking the arrival and establishment of the Delhi Sultanate. Excavations between 1986 and 1996, led by Japanese archaeologists, suggest that the site continued to be built up and expanded through the 1st millennium. Thereafter, the discovery of numerous charcoal remains and burnt soil suggests that a large portion of the site was burnt down and damaged, while other parts went into disuse and suffered the effects of erosion.

The Sravasti site was rediscovered by a team of British and Indian archaeologists in late 19th-century. It has attracted waves of systematic excavations from the late 19th-century through the 1990s. It is now a small town, a center of heritage tourism and religious pilgrimage by Buddhists from around the world.

Location

Shravasti (Sravasti) is located in the southern foothills of the Himalayas, now in Shravasti district of Uttar Pradesh. This is a region of many rivers and rivulets. Sravasti is on the banks of West Rapti river (Achiravati) – now a seasonal river that typically dries up in summer. It is connected to India's highway network with NH-927, 730 and 330.

Nomenclature
Shravasti is also referred to as Saheth-Maheth, or sometimes just Sahet-Mahet, in archaeological and historical scholarship. These are two sites separated by less than 2 kilometers. Saheth is smaller and contains the Jetavana monuments. Maheth refers to the walled complex within a much damaged ancient mud fort. The site is most known for its Buddhist monuments, though significant important ruins of old Hindu and Jain temples along with artwork have also been found here. Adjacent to Maheth, to its northwest, are also medieval era Islamic tombs.

The word Shravasti is rooted in Sanskrit and the Hindu tradition. As per Bhagavata Purana this city was built by a king called Shravasta who descended from Vaivasvata Manu.In Pali and Buddhist literature, it is called Savatthi. Early Buddhist literature paint Savatthi as a mega-urban center in the time of the Buddha. The 5th-century Buddhist commentator and philosopher Buddhaghosa, living some 900 years after the death of the Buddha, states that there were 5.7 million residents in Savatthi. This is implausible and likely a gross exaggeration based on the Buddhist oral traditions. Yet, it also reflects a community memory of Shravasti as a prosperous large capital. In Ajivika and Jaina literature, the same Kosala capital is called Saravana, Kunalnagari and Chandrikapuri. As Saravana, this site is considered the birthplace of Gosala Mankhaliputta.

History

The ancient Shravasti is found in the literature of all major Indian religions. Of these, the Buddhist sources are most extensive. It is also described in more historical records such as those left by the Chinese pilgrims to India.

Buddhist sources
Shravasti is the location where the Buddha gave most of his talks, later remembered by his followers and centuries later written down as Suttas. According to Woodward, 871 suttas in the four Nikayas of Buddhist canons, are based in Shravasti. These texts add that the Buddha spent twenty-five varshas in Shravasti. Scholars such as Rhys Davids state that this could mean two things. Either the Buddha primarily lived in Shravasti after his enlightenment, or that the oral tradition in early Buddhism was "systematized in Shravasti". Malalasekera, a historian of Buddhism, considers the former more likely. Either way, Shravasti is the key site where almost all the remembered teachings of the Buddha were either heard or compiled, and centuries later were recorded as the Pali canon elsewhere.

Shravasti is also mentioned as the capital and home of king Prasenajit – where the royal patron of the Buddha lived. It was also the home of Anathapindada – the richest early donor for the Buddha. Anathapindada is famous in the Buddhist literature as the one who offered his Jetavana grove and residences.

In the Buddhist tradition, the Buddha is remembered for having performed miracles, of which two are particularly popular in reliefs found in its stupas, artwork and literature. The Buddha is believed to have performed the Mahapratiharya or the "great miracle", and the Yamakapratiharya or the "twin miracle" in Shravasti. These are called the "Sravasti miracles".

Jaina sources
Sravasti is oft mentioned in Jaina sources. It is also called Chandrapuri or Chandrikapuri, because Jain texts state that two of their Tirthankaras were born here millions of years ago, in prehistoric times – Sambhavanatha (3rd) and Chandraprabhanatha (8th of 24). Further, Sravasti is the place of the bitter arguments and meeting between Mahavira – the 24th Tirthankara, and Gosala Mankhaliputta – the founder of Ajivikas and a rival. According to the Jain texts, the Mahavira visited Shravasti many times and spent one varsha monsoon season here. He was hosted by a wealthy merchant named Nandinipriya. Ancient Jain scholars such as Kapila, Maghavan and Keshi studied in Shravasti.

Hindu sources
The king of Kosala who patronized the Buddhism, Jainism and Ajivikas in his kingdom, performed Vedic rituals. He sponsored many Vedic schools. In these and others ways, Shravasti is mentioned in numerous Hindu texts. The Buddhist and Jain texts corroborate the presence of numerous Brahmanas (scholars) and Vedic teachers in Shravasti. They are presented as debating ideas, with Buddhist sources showing the ideas of the Buddha to be superior, while Jaina sources showing the ideas of the Tirthankaras as superior, both mocking all the other sides. In Hindu texts such as their epics, Sravasti is claimed to have been founded by a Vedic king named Sravasta (or Sravastaka), himself the son of king Srava. The ancient is extensively mentioned both in the Ramayana and the Mahabharata. Numerous later Hindu texts such as the Harsha-charita and Kathasarit-sagara, base some of their legends in Shravasti.

Chinese pilgrims
The Chinese Pilgrim Fa-Hein travelled to India about 399 CE, and stayed for about 10 years in his quest to learn Sanskrit and obtain original Buddhist texts. He mentions Sravasti, and describes how he reached Kapilavastu from Sravasti. The hints and scenes mentioned by Faxian were one of the basis of an early colonial-era incorrect conjecture on the current location of historic Kapilavastu – the birthplace of Buddha.

Xuanzang describes the country of Shravasti in Fascicle 6 of his travelogue Dà Táng Xīyù Jì. In this fascicle, he presents four countries including Shravasti, and describes the villages and towns in the region as deserted and dilapidated. He says the Shravasti country is over six thousand li in circuit with a capital city that is desolate, though some residents still live here. He mentions it has over hundred monasteries, many dilapidated. In these monasteries, Buddhist monks study Hinayana Buddhism (now called Theravada, Xuanzang belonged to the Mahayana Buddhism tradition). 

He saw the decaying remains of Prasenajit's palace, then to its east the Great Dhamma Hall stupa, another stupa and a temple for the maternal aunt of the Buddha. Next to these, states Xuanzang, is the great stupa of Angulimala. About five li (~2 kilometers in the 7th century) south of the city, he saw the Jetavana garden with two 70 feet high pillars standing in front of a dilapidated monastery. One great pillar has a wheel carved at its top, the other a bull. Xuanzang visits and chronicles all the monuments associated with the Sravasti legends with the Buddha. He also visited a Buddhist temple 60 feet high with a seated Buddha image in Shravasti, and a deva temple about the same size as the Buddha temple, both in good condition. Over sixty li to the northwest of Sravasti capital, he saw a series of stupas built by Ashoka for Kasyapa Buddha.

Archaeological site

The Shravasti archaeological site, also called the Saheth–Maheth site, is to the south of Rapti river. It is surrounded with ruined massive walls about 60 feet high, built about the 3rd-century BCE. These walls become visible from far as one approaches the site. Approaching from Lucknow, after the walls, a right turn takes one to the Maheth site, while the Saheth site with Jetavana monastery is further ahead about half a kilometer away. Further ahead, to the north is the seasonal Rapti river which likely has changed it course over the last 2000 years. The Nepalese Himalayan foothills frame the view to the north.

The Shravasti archaeological site and its potential importance was first identified by the British archaeologist Alexander Cunningham in 1863. At that time, the site was two significant mounds, as well as monuments whose stones and bricks were partly visible and covered with vegetation, all inside the massive ancient wall ruins. Scholars of his time were debating competing candidate locations in India and Nepal for the "ancient site of Shravasti", largely based on the travelogues of Chinese pilgrims. Cunningham linked this site with a colossal Bodhisattva image found nearby with early Kushana era inscription. He also measured and published a pretty detailed map for both Saheth and Maheth.

Excavations from 1876 through 1910s
Cunningham led the first clean up and partial excavation of Shravasti in 1876. This successfully revealed the stupas and small shrines, but these were of a later date. This renewed the debate of whether Cunningham's proposal was correct and where the real Shravasti is. About a decade later, in 1885, Hoey completed a more extensive excavations, but these were also partial. The most significant discovery of Hoey was a Vihara complex with a inscribed stone dated year 1176 in the Vikram era (early 12th-century CE). This established that Shravasti was an active Buddhist site through at least the 12th century, but also confirmed that one of the stupa here was named Jetavana vihara. Around 1908, Vogel led more thorough archaeological excavations here and this confirmed for the first time that the Sahet-Mahet site was indeed the ancient Sravasti much revered in historic Buddhist texts. In 1910, Marshall and Sahni led another expanded excavation and discovered more monuments here. All of these excavations yielded increasing amounts of ancient stupas, temples, sculptures, inscriptions, coins, seals and terracottas. These also confirmed and resonated with most of the sites mentioned in Buddhist texts such as the Chinese pilgrim's records. Yet, all of these monuments and items found during the excavations were from 1st-century CE or after.

Excavation in 1950s
In 1959, Sinha led another series of excavations at Shravasti, particularly near the fort walls of Sahet-Mahet. This yielded evidence that the walls were built and repaired in three periods, ranging between the 3rd-century BCE to about 1st-century CE. The deeper layers also yielded wares with graffiti, jewelry, short sections inscribed in Brahmi script, as well as terracotta figures of mother goddess, a Naga and several plaques of Mithuna figures (Kama, eros-scenes common in Hindu temples). 

Excavations in 1980s and 1990s
Between 1986 and 1996, Japanese archaeologists led by Yoshinori Aboshi completed nine seasons of archaeological excavations in and around the Sravasti site, this time with carbon dating. They reported that the ancient city was surrounded by an earthen rampart with a circumference of about 5.2 kilometers, in a crescent shape (likely along the ancient river) and was spread over 160 hectares. In addition to the wider area, the Japanese team excavated much deeper layers than prior efforts. They report that the layers and items they uncovered from Sravasti are from 8th-century BCE through all of the 1st millennium CE, with large scale monastery construction after the Kushana Empire era. 

The 1986–1996 excavations efforts brought to light a previously unknown, large scale bathing tank (almost square in plan, about 25 meters on one side), another large caitya complex, four new stupas, and other monuments. It also yielded evidence that many Sravasti monuments suffered repeated damage from floods between the 1st and 10th-century, the residents of Sravasti attempted to rebuild some of the monuments several times. The later structures largely and increasingly followed a highly symmetric square plan architecture; for example, a later monastic complex had a square platform, with 28 vihara cells each 2.6 meter square. This structure was built from a mix of bricks and wood, and the excavation process discovered a thick layer of charcoal on top of this large platform. An analysis affirmed that this structure was burnt down, and thereafter completely abandoned by the monks as the combustion products were undisturbed. About 100 meters away from this burnt down site, they discovered another large caitya complex which was also covered with a thick layer of charcoal and combustion residue of the same age. Similar observations across many spots, separated by significant distances, suggests that the Buddhist monastic complexes of Sravasti were likely burnt down at the same time. Further, the carbon dating suggests that the structures in Sravasti were largely built from 1st-century CE through most of the Gupta period. The layers suggest that the monasteries and the city went through a period of stagnation and decline about the 5th century and then expanded again from 7th-century onwards through the 12th-century, then they were burnt down.

The most important finds through the various excavations include:
Buddhist stupas, monasteries and artwork dating through the 12th century, the stupa and vihara locations are mostly consistent with the Chinese pilgrimage records (the different Chinese pilgrims left inconsistent records)
Hindu artwork, including a large number of Ramayana panels and deity artwork
Jaina temple and artwork (now called Shobhnath temple)

Outside of Shravasti is located the stupa where the Buddha performed the Twin Miracle (Pali:).

At the current complex, managed by ASI, many monuments can be seen including the Angulimala's stupa, Anathapindika's stupa, and the Shobhanatha temple. There is an old temple dedicated to a Jain Tirthankara Sambhavanatha, which Jains believe is the site where he was born in pre-historic times.

Contemporary Shravasti
The site of Jetavana monastery is the main pilgrim destination, with meditation and chanting mainly done at the Gandhakuti (Buddha's hut) and the Anandabodhi tree. Buddhist monasteries from the following countries have been constructed at Shravasti: Thailand, South Korea, Sri Lanka, Myanmar, Tibet, and China.

Legacy
The site is the basis of the "Miracle of Sravasti" artwork found in numerous Buddhist sites and literature, all over Asia.

Notes

References

Bibliography

J. Ph. Vogel (1908), The Site of Sravasti, The Journal of the Royal Asiatic Society of Great Britain and Ireland, pp. 971-975, 
  (a more recent, abridged translation)
 Li, Rongxi, trans. (1995). A Biography of the Tripiṭaka Master of the Great Ci’en Monastery of the Great Tang Dynasty. Numata Center for Buddhist Translation and Research. Berkeley, California.  (a recent, full translation)

External links

 
Ancient Indian cities
History of Uttar Pradesh
Buddhist pilgrimage sites in India
Places in the Ramayana
Gonda, Uttar Pradesh
Former populated places in India
Buddhist sites in Uttar Pradesh
Indo-Aryan archaeological sites